Nina Ragettli (born March 6, 1993 in Flims) is a Swiss freestyle skier, specializing in halfpipe.

Ragettli competed at the 2014 Winter Olympics for Switzerland. She placed 22nd in the qualifying round in the halfpipe, failing to advance.

As of September 2015, her best showing at the World Championships is 18th, in the 2013 halfpipe.

Ragettli made her World Cup debut in August 2012. As of September 2015, her best World Cup finish is 6th, at Cardrona in 2013–14. Her best World Cup overall finish in halfpipe is 14th, in 2012–13.

References

1993 births
Living people
Olympic freestyle skiers of Switzerland
Freestyle skiers at the 2014 Winter Olympics
People from Imboden District
Swiss female freestyle skiers
Sportspeople from Graubünden
21st-century Swiss women